San Ciriaco alle Terme Diocleziane was a church in the Baths of Diocletian in Rome. It was made a titulus by the Roman synod of 1 March 499. According to a list written by Pietro Mallio during the pontificate of pope Alexander III, it was linked to the basilica church of Santa Maria Maggiore and its priests celebrated mass alternately at the two churches. In the 12th century it was known as San Ciriaco in thermis and, under pope John XXII, as San Ciriaco in Verminis. The titulus was suppressed by Pope Sixtus V, who replaced it with that of 
Santi Quirico e Giulitta.

List of holders

Titular churches